Jing Jing Luo (born 1953) is a Chinese composer.

Early life and training 
Jing was born in Beijing. She received an undergraduate degree in Shanghai and postgraduate degrees from the New England Conservatory and the State University of New York at Stony Brook.

Luo's fellowships have come from the Asian Council on the Arts, the New York Foundation for the Arts and the Ford and Rockefeller foundations. Her work has been distributed and published by Subito Music Corporation.

In 2014, Luo was included in a concert sponsored by the League of American Orchestras that wished to pair emerging composers with orchestral opportunities.

Selected honors and awards 
Luo has won the following honors and awards:

 Rockefeller Foundation at Bellagio Conference Center (composer residency, 2011). 
 Koussevitzky Music Foundation (2006)
 International Composers Competition for Orchestra Works with the Winnipeg Symphony Orchestra in Canada (3rd prize, 2001). 
 ASCAP awards (1994-2011)
 Ohio Arts Council (Individual Artist Fellowships, 1991-1998)
 Music From China International Composers (Traditional Chinese Instruments Competition, 1999) 
 Chinese Overseas Composer Competition (3rd prize, “No Home to Return,” 1996) 
 American Academy of Arts and Letters, Walter Hinrichsen Award (“The Spell,” 1996)
 Dale Warland Singer’s Reading competition (1st prize, "Chinese Requiem,” 1995) 
 Fanny Mendelssohn International Women Composers Competition (3rd prize, 1993)

References

External links 

Chinese women classical composers
New England Conservatory alumni
Stony Brook University alumni
People's Republic of China emigrants to the United States
20th-century classical composers
21st-century classical composers
Living people
Ashland University faculty
Asian Cultural Council grantees
American classical musicians of Chinese descent
Pupils of Jacob Druckman
Chinese classical composers
21st-century American composers
1953 births
20th-century American women musicians
20th-century American composers
21st-century American women musicians
20th-century women composers
21st-century women composers
American women academics